Gianluca Forcolin (born 28 August 1968 in San Donà di Piave) is a Venetist politician from Veneto, Italy.

A member of Liga Veneta–Lega Nord since 1993, Forcolin was long involved in municipal politics in his hometown, Musile di Piave, of which he had been councillor, assessor, deputy mayor and finally mayor from 2007 to 2015. In the 2008 general election he was elected to the Chamber of Deputies, where he sat in the Finance Committee, but did not stand for re-election five years later because he, a Venetist close to Luca Zaia as well as loyal to former Lega Nord leader Umberto Bossi, was not popular with the new leadership led by Flavio Tosi. He was even suspended from the party for ten months by the local leader Daniele Stival.

In 2015, after Tosi was sidelined by the federal party, Forcolin made his comeback: he was elected to the Regional Council as the most voted candidate of Liga Veneta in the province of Venice and Zaia, who had been re-elected President, appointed him Vice President and minister of Budget and Local Government. In the run-up of the 2020 Venetian regional election Forcolin resigned from the Regional Government, after announcing that his accountant office had asked (but not received) a fiscal bonus related to the Covid-19 crisis, a move that was deemed umpopular by the public and President Zaia himself; Forcolin also renounced to run for re-election.

References

1968 births
Living people
People from San Donà di Piave
Lega Nord politicians
Venetist politicians
Deputies of Legislature XVI of Italy
Members of the Regional Council of Veneto